The Nokia C6-01 is a Symbian^3 smartphone from the Nokia Cseries. The C6-01 display features comes with a 3.2in AMOLED (640 × 360-pixels) display with capacitive touchscreen capabilities and Nokia's ClearBlack technology for improved outdoor visibility. The smartphone was released on November 4, 2010 for €260, excluding taxes and subsidies.

Design

Dimensions
Size: 103.8 × 52.5 × 13.9 mm
Weight (with battery): 
Volume:

Keys and input methods
Physical keys (Menu key, Call and End key, Power key, Lock key, Volume keys and a Two-Step Camera key)
Finger touch support for text input and UI control
On-screen alphanumeric keypad and full keyboard

Appearance
Available in silver grey and black (colour availability varies by country).

Display and user interface
Screen size: 3.2"
Resolution: 16:9 nHD (640 × 360 pixels)
Capacitive touchscreen with Active-matrix OLED technology
 The new ClearBlack technology for improved outdoor visibility.
Orientation sensor
Digital Compass (Magnetometer)
Proximity sensor
Ambient light detector

Personalisation
Up to six customisable home screens (with Symbian Belle)
Widgets
Themes
Customisable profiles
Ring tones: MP3, AAC, eAAC, eAAC+, WMA, AMR-NB, AMR-WB
Video ring tones
Themed icons, wallpapers, screensavers
Changeable colour themes

Hardware
 CPU : ARM11 680 MHz (ARMv6 Architecture).
 RAM : 256 MB SDRAM.
 GPU : 2D/3D Graphics HW Accelerator with OpenVG1.1 and OpenGL ES 2.0 support.
 ROM : 1 GB internal NAND, up to 320 MB available to user.
 microSD memory card slot, hot swappable, 2 GB microSD included; up to 32 GB supported with microSDHC support.

Power management
BL-5CT 1050 mAh Li-Ion battery.
Talk-time (maximum):
GSM 690 mins
WCDMA 270 mins
Standby time (maximum):
GSM 408 h
WCDMA 372 h
Video playback time (maximum): 6 h
Video recording time (maximum): 4 h
Music playback time (maximum): 50 h

Data network
GPRS/EDGE class B
HSDPA Cat9, maximum speed up to 10.2 Mbit/s, HSUPA Cat5 2.0 Mbit/s
WLAN IEEE 802.11 b/g/n
TCP/IP support

Connectivity
2 mm connector
Bluetooth 3.0
Micro USB connector and charging
High-Speed USB 2.0 (micro USB connector)
USB On-The-Go
3.5 mm Nokia AV connector
FM radio

Operating frequency
Quadband GSM/EDGE 850/900/1800/1900
Pentaband WCDMA 850/900/1700/1900/2100
Automatic switching between WCDMA & GSM bands
Flight mode

Software and applications

Software platform and user interface
The C6-01 runs the Symbian^3 operating system. Symbian^3 supports three home screens, each with up to six widgets that the user can customize.
First software update Symbian Anna with major improvements was released. Again, Symbian Anna was replaced with Nokia Belle on February 7, 2012 which brings major improvements in user interface and core functions.

Applications
PC Applications: Nokia Ovi Suite, Nokia Ovi Player
Online applications: Nokia Ovi Store, internet, messaging, Maps, Web TV,  Mail, Chat

Personal information management (PIM)
Detailed contact information
Calendar
To-do list
Notes
Recorder
Calculator
Clock

Navigation
Integrated GPS, with A-GPS functionality
Ovi Maps with free car and pedestrian navigation

Photography

Camera
8 megapixel Digital camera Fullscreen 16:9 viewfinder with easy-to-use touchscreen parameters
Still images file format: JPEG/Exif
Smart Zoom up to 2× (digital) for still images
Smart Zoom up to 3× (digital) for video
Secondary camera for video calls (VGA, 640×480 pixels)
Face recognition software

Image capture
Automatic location tagging of images and videos
Photo editor

Other
Internal memory: up to 340 MB
2 GB MicroSD memory card included, hot swappable, up to 32 GB
High-Speed microUSB to PC connectivity
Processor:680Mhz

Video

Video cameras
Main camera
Video capture in 720p 25 fps with codecs H.264, MPEG-4
Secondary VGA camera for video calls

Video sharing and playback
HD 720p Video playback
Video call and video sharing support (WCDMA network services)

Music and audio

Music features
Flick scroll user interface to browse the albums in your music collection
Music codecs: MP3, WMA, AAC, eAAC, eAAC+, AMR-NB, AMR-WB

Radio
Stereo FM radio (Wired headphones must be plugged in as they are used as the antenna)(FM Transmitter not included)

References

External links
 Nokia C6-01 Product Specifications
 Nokia C6-01 press release
 Nokia C6-01 Device Details at Forum Nokia

Nokia smartphones
Mobile phones introduced in 2010
Mobile phones with user-replaceable battery